The Government Sadiq Egerton College, also known as S.E. College, is an automous government college located in Bahawalpur, Pakistan. It is named after the Nawab of Bahawalpur Nawab Sadiq Mohammad Khan Abbasi IV and Lieutenant Governor of the Punjab Sir Robert Eyles Egerton. It has a tradition of providing an education that uses academics, sports and co-curricular activities as tools for character development.

History
The Government Sadiq Egerton College was founded as Sir Robert Egerton School, also called Upper Egerton School, in 1882. The site of the school was later converted into a hospital, named Zanana Hospital.

In April 1886, it was upgraded to the college status and renamed after Sadeq Mohammad Khan IV and Robert Eyles Egerton.

In 1892, degree classes were started by the college.

Between 1905 and 1911, a new building was constructed for the college which currently is Sadiq Dane High School, and its operation were shifted there once the work was completed.

In 1951, prime minister of Bahawalpur, John Dring, laid the foundation of the new building of the college and its classes were shifted there.

In 1970, the college gained postgraduate college status.

In 2016, the website of the college was launched.

Former principals
 Babu Parson Kumar Bose
 Rana Muhammad Siddique

Notable alumni
 Ahmad Nadeem Qasmi

References

External links
 Educational Services of Sadiq Egerton College Bahawalpur

Universities and colleges in Bahawalpur
1882 establishments in British India